Tracy Austin defeated the two-time defending champion Martina Navratilova in the final, 6–2, 2–6, 6–2 to win the singles tennis title at the 1980 Avon Championships.

Seeds
  Martina Navratilova (final)
  Tracy Austin (champion)

Draw

Finals

Round robin

Group A

Q: qualifies to semifinals. PO: advances to play-off round.

Group B

Q: qualifies to semifinals. PO: advances to play-off round.

External links
 Official results archive (ITF)
 Official results archive (WTA)

Singles
1980 WTA Tour